Lea Wermelin (born 10 May 1985 in Rønne) is a Danish politician. She has been a member of Folketinget for the Social Democrats from 2015. She was appointed Minister for the Environment in the Frederiksen Cabinet from 27 June 2019.

Early life
Born in Rønne, she's the daughter of schoolteacher Hans Wermelin and nurse Bodil Wermelin. She graduated in Political Science at the University of Copenhagen.

Political career
Wermelin was elected into parliament in the 2015 Danish general election and re-elected in 2019. She was appointed Minister for the Environment on 27 June 2019.

References

External links 
 Biography on the website of the Danish Parliament (Folketinget)

1985 births
Living people
People from Bornholm
Social Democrats (Denmark) politicians
Women members of the Folketing
21st-century Danish women politicians
Government ministers of Denmark
Women government ministers of Denmark
Members of the Folketing 2015–2019
Members of the Folketing 2019–2022
20th-century Danish women
Members of the Folketing 2022–2026